Complexity measure / measure of complexity may refer to any measure defined in various branches of complexity theory, specifically:
in Computational complexity theory
Blum axioms
Programming complexity
Halstead complexity measures
Cyclomatic complexity
Time complexity
Parametrized complexity
in complex systems theory and applications
Forecasting complexity
Effective complexity
Kolmogorov complexity, a measure of algorithmic complexity
Self-dissimilarity
 in information theory
Information fluctuation complexity
 in model theory
U-rank
 in statistical learning theory / computational learning theory
VC dimension
Rademacher complexity
in linguistics/computer linguistics
linguistic sequence complexity
in computer networks
network complexity

Complex systems theory
Measures of complexity